Zagreb Cathedral, located at Kaptol, Zagreb, is a Roman Catholic cathedral-church. It is the second tallest building in Croatia and also the most monumental sacral building in Gothic style southeast of the Alps. It is dedicated to the Assumption of Mary and to kings Saint Stephen and Saint Ladislaus. The cathedral is typically Gothic, as is its sacristy, which is of great architectural value. Its prominent spires are considered to be landmarks as they are visible from most parts of the city. One of its two spires was damaged in the 2020 Zagreb earthquake.

History
In 1093 when King Ladislaus I of Hungary (1040-1095) moved the bishop's chair from Sisak to Zagreb, he proclaimed the existing church as a cathedral. Construction on the cathedral started shortly after his death and was finished in 1217 and consecrated by king Andrew II of Hungary. The building was destroyed by the Mongols in 1242 but rebuilt by bishop Timothy (1263–1287) a few years later. At the end of the 15th century, the Ottoman Empire invaded Croatia, triggering the construction of fortification walls around the cathedral, some of which are still intact. In the 17th century, a single fortified renaissance watchtower was erected on the south side and was used as a military observation point, because of the Ottoman threat.

The cathedral was severely damaged in the 1880 Zagreb earthquake. The main nave collapsed and the individual tower was damaged beyond repair. The restoration-reconstruction of the cathedral in Neo-Gothic style was led by Hermann Bollé, bringing the cathedral to its present form.

The cathedral was depicted on the reverse of the Croatian 1000 kuna banknote issued in 1993.

When facing the portal, the building is 46 meters wide and 104 and 105 meters high, respectively. The cathedral contains a relief of Cardinal Aloysius Stepinac with Christ done by the Croatian sculptor Ivan Meštrović. The cathedral was visited by Pope Benedict XVI on 5 June 2011 where he celebrated Sunday Vespers and prayed before the tomb of Blessed Aloysius Stepinac.

The cathedral was damaged in the 2020 earthquake on 22 March, in which the tip of its southern spire broke off and crashed onto the roof of the adjacent Archbishop's Palace. On 17 April 2020, the northern spire of Zagreb Cathedral was removed due to leaning during the earthquake.

Treasury 
The cathedral holds a treasury (riznica) that include various metal vessels, liturgical vestments, and liturgical books collected during various periods of its history. Among these objects most notable are medieval St. Ladislaus cloak, Plenarium made out of ivory, and baroque Reliquary-bust of King Saint Stephen.

Gallery

See also

History of Zagreb
History of Croatia
St. Mark's Church
Kaptol
Gradec
Ban Jelačić Square
List of Gothic Cathedrals in Europe

References

External links

 Zagreb Cathedral; Zagreb Tourist Info
 Zagreb Cathedral; Visit Zagreb - Travel Guide
 Zagreb Cathedral 
"Đavlova glava u zagrebačkoj katedrali" 
Part 1
Part 2
Part 3
Part 4
Part 5
Part 6
Part 7
Part 8
Part 9
Part 10
Zagreb cathedral in the 1880 earthquake and its present day renovation 

Roman Catholic churches completed in 1906
1906 establishments in Croatia
Religious buildings and structures in Zagreb
Tourist attractions in Zagreb
Gornji Grad–Medveščak
Hermann Bollé buildings
Roman Catholic cathedrals in Croatia
13th-century Roman Catholic church buildings in Croatia
Gothic architecture in Croatia